The cuisine of East Timor consists of regional popular foods such as pork, fish, basil, tamarind, legumes, corn, rice, root vegetables, and tropical fruit. East Timorese cuisine has influences from Malay and Portuguese dishes from its colonisation by Portugal. Flavours and ingredients from other former Portuguese colonies can be found due to the presence of Portuguese soldiers from other colonies in East Timor.

East Timorese dishes 
As agriculture is the main occupation in East Timor, the primary food is rice, which is cultivated widely in this country. Apart from rice, other staple food items that are cultivated in East Timor include sweet potatoes, maize, cassava, and taro. These primary staples are supplemented with beans, cabbage, spinach, onions and cowpeas.

The second category of food consists of poultry, pigs, and goats. Most homes in East Timor raise their own food animals for meat. Fish is also a source of animal protein in this country as fishing is also an important occupation after agriculture.

 Batar daan- A popular dish of corn, mung beans, and pumpkin.
 Budu- A sauce of tomato, mint, lime, and Spanish onion.
Fuuntaul tong and gailong- A popular soup dish, red beans, beef, lettuce, and egg with rice.

 Ikan sabuko- A Spanish mackerel in tamarind marinade with basil and capsicum.
 Tapai- A fermented rice dish. It is sweet, sour, and slightly alcoholic.
 Caril - A mild chicken curry with a roasted capsicum and coconut paste.
 Feijoada – A common dish of former Portuguese colonies, it is made with pork, cannellini beans and chorizo.

Hungry season 
East Timor's crops rely on the rains that come following the annual dry season. This leads to a period of poor food security called the "hungry season" from November to February due to the unpredictable climate. Many households depend on their own production of food because of the erratic climate conditions, such as droughts.

Many families subsist on akar, which is a widely available food source for the poor. It is dried palm tree bark, beaten into a powder, mixed with water to form a jelly and then cooked over fire. This leads to cases where nearly 58% of children under the age of five suffer from chronic malnutrition.

Desserts 

 Bibingka- A grilled and layered coconut cake
 Portuguese tart (pastel de nata)- an egg tart pastry

Coffee 
The coffee of East Timor is organic and a major cash crop for the island nation. Coffee accounts for 90 percent of the country's non-oil exports, while 46 percent of East Timorese households rely solely on coffee for their income.

The crop has grown in the country for centuries. It accounted for half of the country's trade when it was a Portuguese colony in the late 1800s, but during 24 years of Indonesian occupation the bumper business was neglected when the military took over – prices fluctuated and many coffee plantations were battlefields so the quality of beans worsened.

By the war's end, agricultural experts estimated two generation's worth of farming knowledge was lost and some plantations were abandoned. But because the trees got little attention the pesticide and fertiliser-free groves are popular for organic coffee lovers. Today, the coffee is known as the golden prince of East Timor agriculture - worth $10 million a year, 46,000 coffee farms employ one-fifth of East Timor's population but it is a major battle to encourage farmers to improve the quality of East Timor's agriculture.

References

East Timorese culture
East Timor